A cockroach is an insect of the order Blattodea. 

Cockroach may also refer to:

Books
 Cockroach (novel), a 2008 novel by Rawi Hage
 The Cockroach (novella), a 2019 novella by Ian McEwan
 Cockroaches (novel), the second novel in the Harry Hole series by Jo Nesbø

Films
 , a 2010 film by Luke Eve
 "Cockroaches" (CSI episode), an episode of CSI: Crime Scene Investigation
 Walter Bradley, aka Cockroach, a character in The Cosby Show

Music
 Cockroach (album), a 2001 album by Danger Danger
 Cockroaches (EP), a 1987 EP by Voivod
 The Cockroaches, an Australian band in the 1980s

Other
 Cockroach Labs, software company that sells CockroachDB
 Cockroach, nickname for a pro-democracy protestor during the 2019–20 Hong Kong protests

See also
 Kockroach, a 2007 novel by William Lashner under the name "Tyler Knox"